The Army High Altitude School (AHAS) is a training and research school of Pakistan Army located in Rattu, Gilgit Baltistan, Pakistan. In December 1987, Pakistan Army established this training school for  troops in high altitude and mountain warfare including skiing.

History 
The Army High Altitude School is one of the youngest schools in Pakistan Army established in 1987. The school has trained number troops in a very short span of time in mountain warfare in high altitude and skiing.

Training 
AHAS school train students in skiing, high altitude and mountain warfare operations. Training is delivered in the form of lectures, demonstrations and practices. Army High Altitude School also undertakes number of trekking and mountaineering expeditions at many famous peaks.

Faculty 
The AHAS school training team consist of Officers, Junior Commissioned Officers (JCOs) and Non Commissioned Officers (Jawans). The all training staff of AHAS school is highly qualified in mountain warfare and high altitude operations.

References 

Training formations of Pakistan Army
Military academies of Pakistan